Gateway Station may refer to:

Transportation stations
 Gateway Station (Charlotte), a proposed intermodal transit facility
 Gateway station (SkyTrain), a rapid transit station in Metro Vancouver, British Columbia
 The Gateway Multimodal Transportation Center, or Gateway Station, in St. Louis
 Gateway / Northeast 99th Avenue Transit Center, or Gateway station, on the MAX Light Rail system in Portland, Oregon
 Gateway station (PAAC), a Pittsburgh Light Rail station
 Gateway Monorail Station, on the defunct Sentosa Monorail, in Singapore
 Gateway Station, on the Emerald Express bus rapid transit system in Eugene, Oregon

Other uses
 Lunar Gateway, aka Gateway, a proposed international space station around the Moon
 Exploration Gateway Platform, an orbital platform proposal by Boeing
 Gateway Station, a fictional asteroid station in the Frederick Pohl fictional universe of the Heechee

See also
 Gateway (disambiguation)